Genderism may refer to:

 Gender binarism, the classification of gender into two distinct, opposite, and disconnected forms of masculine and feminine 
 Gender essentialism, the theory that universal features in social gender are at the root of all differences between men and women
 Discrimination against non-binary gender people, discrimination against people who do not identify as exclusively masculine or feminine
 Gender ideology, a concept criticised by the anti-gender movement

See also
 Gender
 Gender mainstreaming
Gender polarization
Gender policing
 Gender studies
 Postgenderism
 Sexism